Cabify is a multi-mobility platform for people and objects that offers various alternatives to reduce urban travel in private cars, taking advantage of technology to make cities better places to live. The company operates in Spain and Latin America (Mexico, Chile, Colombia, Peru, Argentina and Uruguay), the company offers two services, one for businesses and another for individuals.

Cabify was founded in May 2011 by Juan de Antonio, and is Spain's first-ever Unicorn company.

History

Development in Spain
Cabify was founded in May 2011 by Juan de Antonio, a Spanish entrepreneur, telecommunications engineer, and graduate of Stanford University. De Antonio was motivated to create a vehicle for hire company after receiving negative market feedback due to high upfront costs when trying to introduce electric vehicles in European cities. De Antonio started discussing the idea with Adeyemi Ajao, one of the founders of Tuenti, and Brendan F. Wallace. Cabify set up its first transportation network in Madrid, and the idea attracted investors from Silicon Valley. Juan de Antonio stayed as the CEO, while Ajao and Wallace became advisors as they continued leading their own startup. Samuel Lown joined as the CTO in July with Michael Koper and Adrian Merino joining the team two months later.

Initially, the service was called "Executive" and was intended for a niche group, with high-end vehicles that were slightly more expensive than taxis. In February 2012, Cabify had 20,000 users and completed nearly 3,000 rides in Madrid alone. In the next two years, more than 150 taxi drivers in Madrid joined the company.

In June 2013, the company launched Cabify Lite, with mid-range vehicles that were usually cheaper than taxis. By the end of 2015, Cabify Lite represented 85% of the company's offer.  In 2016, the company partnered with Waze to complete its trips more quickly and improve driver and passenger safety. In 2016, Cabify launched in Portugal (Lisbon),

The company operates in eight Spanish cities as of 2017 – Madrid, Barcelona, Valencia, Bilbao, Vitoria, A Coruña, Málaga, and Sevilla – and on the island of Tenerife. In July 2018, a violent taxi-driver strike in Barcelona forced the company to suspend its services until further notice. In September 2018, drivers for ride-hailing services including Cabify protested against the Spanish government's proposition to tighten up rules for ride-hailing services. In January 2019, Cabify suspended its operations in Barcelona after the Catalan government voted a new rule requiring a 15-minute notice for booking a car. Its service was restored in Barcelona in March 2019. A specific system architecture for Catalonia alone was developed to comply with the region's harsher laws.

In May 2022, the company received a 40 million loan from the European Investment Bank to purchase a fleet of electric vehicles for use in Spain, in order to meet the European Union's goal of eliminating carbon emissions.

In Latin America
A year after its foundation in Spain, Cabify launched its operations in Latin America, opening subsidiaries in Mexico, Chile and Peru.

Within a few years, 80% of Cabify's income would come from the American continent.

In 2016, Cabify increased expansion in Mexico. The Hoy No Circula program in Mexico City generated a 200% increase in demand. During that period, Cabify reduced its tariffs by 25% to motivate the inhabitants to use alternative means of transportation. Also, it donated a part of its revenues to UNICEF. At that time, the company operated in six Mexican cities: Mexico City, Monterrey, Querétaro, Puebla City, Guadalajara and Toluca.

In 2016, Cabify started operating in Argentina (Buenos Aires and Rosario), Brazil (Sao Paulo), Costa Rica, Bolivia and Panama. It also announced it would expand its current services to new cities, such as Valparaíso and Viña del Mar in Chile.

Cabify started offering services to the corporate sector in Bogotá in 2015. Cabify late opened in Cali in April 2016 and announced its expansion to Medellín and the Caribbean region, more precisely to the cities of Barranquilla and Cartagena. It planned to offer its services in Pereira, Manizales and Bucaramanga later in the year.

In March 2017, the killing of the 19-year-old girl Maria Castilla by a Cabify driver in Mexico raised the question of safety with ride-hailing services. Cabify installed a panic button in its app to prevent other similar crimes.

Investments
In September 2012, the company raised a $4 million Series Seed investment round from Black Vine, Belgian fund Emerge, angel investors sourced via AngelList (including the Winklevoss twins), and a series of Latin American investors.

A second $8-million investment was round up in April 2014, and led by Seaya Ventures.

The company's biggest investor, Japanese e-commerce giant Rakuten, which is also a lead investor in taxi-app player Lyft, made its first investment in Cabify in October 2015, when it provided capital for a further push into Latin America. Cabify's revenues had risen to $40m, from $10m in 2014 and $1m in 2013. In April 2016, Rakuten invested $92 million more in Cabify. Rakuten's investment was a part of a round of funding in which Cabify raised $120 million. After the 2016 financing, Cabify was valued at around $320 million.

In January 2018, Cabify raised an additional $160 million, valuing the company at $1.4 billion. The company cut down 10% of its workforce and reorganized its top management.

Description

Service
Cabify operates as the contact point between customers and private drivers by means of its mobile app for Android and iPhone, as well as its web page. Users pay for the service via their credit card or PayPal account, with cash payments introduced in 2016. The payment system is protected by Symantec's Verisign security. Cabify has 400 permanent employees. Cabify offers three core classes of vehicles: Executive, with vehicles such as Mercedes S-Class or Audi A8, Lite (e.g. Toyota Avensis), or Group (6 persons).

The app shows the location of drivers to the customer, calls the closest driver, directs the driver, and plays the role of intermediary for payments, taking a commission of around 20%. Once the ride is over, Cabify sends a summary to the customer's mobile phone, including information such as the distance, duration and cost of the ride. The customer can evaluate the ride and the driver. Locations can be saved as favorites to be accessed more easily. The system has a waiting queue, where it keeps looking for a ride over a period indicated by the customer (from 5 to 30 minutes). The service can be reserved up to 30 days in advance. The app integrates with Waze. The service includes the possibility of real-time tracking between departure and arrival. If the signal is lost for more than sixty seconds or the route changes considerably, the passenger will receive a telephone call verifying their comfort and safety. The app allows the customer to choose the type of vehicle (Executive, Lite or Group), and offers a wide range of free options, such as the driver speaking a foreign language, the desired air-conditioning temperature, the driver opening the door or calling upon arrival, and the desired radio station.

The company serves two types of clients: corporate and private passengers, with the former taking up 60% of Cabify's offer. Cabify claims corporate users are the focus of the company's service offering.

Other services
Cabify also offers a number of other services depending on the city, including: Cabify Express, a service of immediate delivery via moto taxis, in Peru; Cabify Taxi, a service for accessing local taxi cabs, in Spain; Cabify City, a service of independent drivers, in Chile; Cabify Bike, a service where users can ride with their bikes in Chile, and Cabify Cash, a service where users pay with cash instead of credit cards, in Peru.

Cabify also has a transportation option for disabled persons. Since then, the service has been opened in Chile, Spain and Peru. Cabify's plans for the future include global expansion of Cabify Access, its service for the disabled.

The company is trying to grow in a sound way by forging relationships with local businesses, hiring both traditional taxis and regular consumers as Cabify drivers, and placing heavy emphasis on repeat customers, for example by steering its cars in peak hours towards habitual users rather than those that offer the most lucrative one-off fare. Because of this approach, the company claims that it has no need to subsidize drivers or offer steep discounts to users, unlike many of its rivals.

Pricing
Cabify charges per kilometer of the optimal route. This means that it optimizes the distance between two points so the passenger is paying for the most direct route regardless of the actual route chosen by the driver. Uber, in comparison, charges according to minutes and kilometers spent inside the vehicles.

Moreover, Cabify has fixed pricing (Since December this was removed in the Brazilian territory), where the price per kilometer does not change depending on the time of the day. Uber, on the other hand, has dynamic prices, which change depending on peak hours, weather and local events. Cabify described it as a socially motivated feature: "We are not something that the driver does in his free time. We are his main source of income. We don't think it should be something occasional, but a job that can sustain a family."

Drivers
Cabify cars and drivers pass a rigorous selection and filtration process. All drivers must pass psychometric tests, tests for alcohol and drugs, and a city orientation test. They must show they have no criminal record or traffic violations. The murder of a young female customer in Puebla, Mexico, by one of Cabify's drivers raises important questions about the credibility of any filtration process carried out by the company.

All drivers are required to wear professional attire, to be polite, to attend to the needs of the passenger which may include additional services such as in-car reading materials and Cabify-branded water. Drivers are required to take the fastest way to the destination. If they change the route without the passenger's approval, they can be penalized by Cabify.

Legal position
Cabify tries to work with governments to find a way to operate legally. In the case of Spain, all the drivers work as "collaborators" for Cabify, and they do this under a commercial contract for the supply of services, either as part of a company or as freelance owners of a VTC vehicle fleet  (Chauffeur Driven Vehicle). They can be either the direct suppliers of the service or provide it through hired personnel under the Social Security's legislation. Cabify doesn't take care of the registration of self-employed workers. Instead, they need to be considered as such, before they begin to collaborate with the company. Cabify's drivers don't receive monthly or yearly fixed salaries from the company. Their income comes from the invoicing of journeys and the amount of services they have provided.

Cabify's control system allows them to keep track of all payments and charges that come from them because journeys are not allowed to be paid in cash. This helps eliminate the informal economy and the precariousness currently present in the rest of  urban transportation's segments.

The taxi union of Santiago protested against Cabify and Uber, announcing a national strike in May 2016. Several Chilean celebrities who use Cabify's services, including Cristián Sánchez and Renata Ruiz, supported the company by filming a video where they give their reasons for using Cabify. After trying to find a legal solution with the Chilean government for over six months without success, Cabify launched Cabify City, which connects independent car owners with users on the Cabify app. Cabify City is its first unregulated service.

On May 9, 2017, the Colombian Superintendence of Ports and Transport fined Cabify $516 million Colombian pesos (about $173,240 United States dollars), as it "facilitated the transgression of transport laws stated by the Government of Colombia, by allowing personal transport services to operate in special transport vehicles that were not authorized by the Ministry of Transport for this modality of services".

References

External links
 

Companies based in Madrid
Transport companies established in 2011
Ridesharing companies
Location-based software
Road transport in Spain
Online companies of Spain
Transport companies of Spain
Spanish brands
2011 establishments in Spain
Internet technology companies of Spain